This is a complete list of Members of Parliament elected to the Parliament of the United Kingdom at the 1945 general election, held on 5 July 1945. See also, Constituency election results in the 1945 United Kingdom general election.

Notable newcomers to the House of Commons included Michael Stewart, George Brown, Hartley Shawcross, Barbara Castle, Bessie Braddock, Richard Crossman, Michael Foot, George Thomas, George Wigg, Woodrow Wyatt, Harold Wilson, James Callaghan, Hugh Gaitskell, Derick Heathcoat-Amory and Selwyn Lloyd.

Composition
This diagram show the composition of the parties in the 1945 general election.

Note: This is not the official seating plan of the House of Commons, which has five rows of benches on each side, with the government party to the right of the Speaker and opposition parties to the left, but with room for only around two-thirds of MPs to sit at any one time.
The Commons Chamber was hit by bombs and the roof of Westminster Hall was set on fire. The fire service said that it would be impossible to save both, so it was decided to concentrate on saving the Hall.
The Commons Chamber was entirely destroyed by the fire which spread to the Members' Lobby and caused the ceiling to collapse. By the following morning, all that was left of the Chamber was a smoking shell. As the Commons Chamber was totally destroyed and the Lords Chamber was damaged, both Houses moved to the Church House annexe and sat there from 13 May.
From late June 1941 until October 1950, the Commons met in the Lords Chamber, while the Lords met in the Robing Room (a fact which was kept secret during the war).

° Sir Edward Campbell died on 17 July and Leslie Pym died on 18 July before the poll was announced. By-elections were held in the autumn
× The sitting MP for Hull, Central, Walter Windsor, died during the election campaign. Mark Hewitson was elected in a postponed poll in August.

By-elections 
See the list of United Kingdom by-elections.

Changes

1946 – Ernest Millington (Chelmsford) joins Labour Party from Common Wealth Party
1947 – Campbell Stephen (Glasgow, Camlachie) joins Labour Party from Independent Labour Party shortly before death
1947 – John McGovern (Glasgow, Shettleston) joins Labour Party from Independent Labour Party
1947 – Tom Horabin (North Cornwall) joins Labour Party from Liberal Party
1948 – James Carmichael (Glasgow, Bridgeton) joins Labour Party from Independent Labour Party (last ILP MP)
March 1948 – John Mackie (Galloway) rejoins Conservative Party having been deselected in 1945 (stood as an Independent Unionist in 1945 election)
1948 – Ivor Thomas (Keighley) defects from the Labour Party to the Conservative Party over iron and steel nationalisation
1948 – Alfred Edwards (Middlesbrough East) defects from the Labour Party to the Conservative Party over iron and steel nationalisation
1948 – John Platts-Mills (Finsbury) expelled from Labour Party over opposition to foreign policy and support for Italian Socialist Party; sits as Labour Independent
May 1949 – Konni Zilliacus (Gateshead) expelled from Labour Party over opposition to NATO and foreign policy; sits as Labour Independent
May 1949 – Leslie Solley (Thurrock) expelled from Labour Party over opposition to NATO and foreign policy; sits as Labour Independent
May 1949 – Lester Hutchinson (Manchester, Rusholme) expelled from Labour Party over opposition to NATO and foreign policy; sits as Labour Independent
1949 – Konni Zilliacus (Gateshead) breaks with Labour Independent Group over their support for Stalin against Tito

See also
 1945 United Kingdom general election
 List of parliaments of the United Kingdom
 List of United Kingdom by-elections (1931–1950)

References

 The Times House of Commons 1945 (1945), The Times, London.

1945
1945 United Kingdom general election
 List
UK MPs